(English: '1 Reason') is the second studio album by Croatian singer Lana Jurčević. It was released in 2006 by Hit Records.

Track listing 
 "" (with Luka Nižetić)
 ""
 ""
 ""
 ""
 ""
 ""
 ""
 ""
 ""

References

2006 albums
Hit Records (Croatia) albums
Croatian-language albums
Lana Jurčević albums